Ladislas Segoe (1894–1983) was a pioneer in urban planning. An immigrant from Austria-Hungary to the United States, he worked with Alfred Bettman on the City Plan for Cincinnati.

External links
 Ladislas Segoe and the Emergence of the Professional Planning Consultant  Edelman and Allor

1894 births
1983 deaths
American urban planners
Austro-Hungarian emigrants to the United States